SønderjyskE is a Danish sport club. They have two handball teams (one male based in Sønderborg, one female based in Aabenraa), two football teams (one professional male club and one professional female club, both based in Haderslev) and an ice hockey team based in Vojens. All the teams play in Southern Jutland. The name is short for Sønderjysk Elitesport (English language: Southern Jutlandic Elite Sport).

History
SønderjyskE was created as a club for the whole region of South Jutland as it was obvious that it was impossible to create elite teams able to compete in the top leagues on the former basis of city teams. The men's football team used to be solely based in the city of Haderslev under the name Haderslev FK. In 2004 all the elite teams in football, ice hockey and handball merged into SønderjyskE, enabling the clubs to represent not only a city but the whole region of South Jutland (Sønderjylland), which drew more attention to the teams from sponsors, fans and media and made it easier to keep talents in South Jutland.

As of 2009-07-01 4 of the 5 teams in the club play in the best Danish leagues: Men's football (Latest position: 6th), women's football (latest position: relegated to second-best league), women's handball (latest position: 12th) and the ice hockey team (latest position: 1st). The male handball team finished 1st in the second-best Danish league.

Team (Men)

Staff

Current squad
Squad for the 2022-23 season

Goalkeeper
 12  Kasper Larsen
 26  Rasmus Bech
Wingers
LW
 6  Nikolaj Svalastog
 67  Tobias Møller
RW
 10  Nikolai Vinther 
 18  Alec Smit 
 24  Sebastian Augustinussen
Pivots
 14  Jacob Bagersted
 18  Morten Bjørnshauge

Back players
LB
 3  Oliver Nøddesbo Eggert
 25  Kristian Jakobsen Stranden
CB
 19  Malthe Damgaard
 20  August Wiger
 66  Noah Gaudin
RB
 4  Andreas Lang
 14  Tobias Olsen

Transfers
Transfers for the season 2023-24

Joining
  Lasse Folkman (AC) (from  Fredericia HK)
  Nicolaj Jørgensen (CB) (from  Team Sydhavsøerne)

Leaving
  Noah Gaudin (CB) (to  Skjern Håndbold)
  Malthe Damgaard (CB) (to  TM Tønder)
  Marius Galta Ferkingstad (P) (to ) (Immediately)

Team (women)

Staff

Current squad
Squad for the 2022-23 season

Goalkeeper
 1  Alberte Stenderup
 12  Stine Broløs Kristensen
Wingers
LW
 5  Mette Lassen
 9  Katja Johansen
RW
 6  Lea Hansen
 11  Pernille Johansen 
Pivot
 7  Ricka Gindrup
 24  Josefine Dragenberg

Back players
LB
 8  Tine Geertsen
 14  Louise Ellebæk
 22  Olivia Simonsen
CB
 4  Celina Hansen  (c) 
 13  Sofie Schelde-Rasmussen
 28  Sarah Paulsen
RB
 19  Eline Osland

Transfers
Transfers for the 2022-23 season

Joining
  Rikke Hoffbeck (LW) (from  Skanderborg Håndbold)
  Line Uno (CB) (from  Ikast Håndbold)

Leaving
  Mette Lassen (LB) (Retires)

References

Danish handball clubs
Handball clubs established in 2004
2004 establishments in Denmark
SønderjyskE